The Colegio Máximo de San José (English: Maximum College of St. Joseph) is a Jesuit religious college in San Miguel, Buenos Aires, Argentina. Pope Francis studied in it during his youth.

History
When the Jesuits first established in San Miguel, they bought a terrain of 36 hectares and established a school in it. The terms "Colegio máximo" ("Maximum College") is an internal standard in the Society of Jesus for schools of philosophy and theology, the most important studies in a Jesuit's career. It was established in 1932, with the approval of the Vatican. The degrees of philosophy and theology have civil value since 1967 and 1968.

In popular culture
The Colegio, which was attended by Jorge Mario Bergoglio (the future Pope Francis), is portrayed in the 2019 Netflix biographical film The Two Popes.

See also
 List of Jesuit sites

References

Jesuit universities and colleges
Universities in Buenos Aires Province
San Miguel Partido
University and college buildings completed in 1932
1932 establishments in Argentina